Porvenir or Pueblo Porvenir is a village in the Paysandú Department of western Uruguay.

Geography
It is an enclave within the populated rural area known as Chacras de Paysandú (Ranches of Paysandú), which is peripheral to the city.

History
On 17 July 1903, it was declared a "Pueblo" (village) named "Colonia Porvenir" by the Act of Ley Nº 2.855.

Population
In 2011 Porvenir had a population of 1,159.
 
Source: Instituto Nacional de Estadística de Uruguay

References

External links
INE map of Porvenir

Populated places in the Paysandú Department